Goodfellow's tuco-tuco (Ctenomys goodfellowi) is a species of rodent in the family Ctenomyidae. It is endemic to Bolivia, where it is found in the Chiquitano dry forest ecoregion, bordering on the cerrado. Its karyotype has 2n = 46 and FN = 68. The species is named after British collector Walter Goodfellow.

References

Mammals of Bolivia
Tuco-tucos
Endemic fauna of Bolivia
Mammals described in 1921
Taxa named by Oldfield Thomas